Koh-Lanta: Johor is the fourteenth season of the French version of Survivor, Koh-Lanta. This season takes place in Sibu Island, Johor, Malaysia where 20 ordinary people will survive in the wilderness for 40 days. In the end, one will win €100,000 and be crowned Sole Survivor. The main twist this season occurred on day 4 where each tribe had to banish two tribe mates to an island where they will stay indefinitely until further notice. The season premiered on 24 April 2015 and concluded on 24 July 2015 when Marc Rambaud won in a 9-2 jury vote against Chantel Ménard to be crowned Sole Survivor.

Finishing order

Future appearances
Alban Pellegrin, Cédric Giosserand-Lucas and Chantal Ménard returned for Koh-Lanta: Le Combat des Héros. Jessica Potel returned for Koh-Lanta: L'Île des héros.

Voting history

Notes
A black vote in the voting chart indicates a vote cast by the contestant eliminated that is used for the subsequent tribal council.

References

External links

French reality television series
Koh-Lanta seasons
2015 French television seasons
Television shows filmed in Malaysia